Frances Farmer Presents is an American anthology series that aired on Indianapolis station WFBM-TV (then an NBC affiliate). The series premiered on October 13, 1958 and ended in September 1964.

Synopsis
Film actress Frances Farmer had gone to Indianapolis to appear in the play The Chalk Garden, where a WFBM executive saw her performance and suggested she would be an ideal celebrity to host their new daily series showcasing vintage films. The show premiered in October 1958, and quickly became the top-rated show in its time period, a position it retained until it left the air in September 1964. It was one of the first locally produced television programs to be broadcast in color.

Farmer not only introduced the daily feature, she also frequently interviewed visiting celebrities, people as diverse as Mitch Miller, Dan Blocker, Marsha Hunt, Marge Champion, and her ex-husband Leif Erickson.  Farmer also took her show on the road to Purdue University.  There is existing film of her two weeks at Purdue, where she hosted the show while simultaneously appearing in The Sea Gull.  Farmer interviewed many of the students appearing in the play, as well as Purdue's president and theater department chairman, Joseph Stockdale.

References

External links
 
 Shedding Light on Shadowland: An essay about Farmer and the series

1958 American television series debuts
1964 American television series endings
1950s American anthology television series
1960s American anthology television series
English-language television shows
American non-fiction television series